Roy Clement Milne (14 November 1909 – 14 July 1977) was an Australian rules footballer who played with Fitzroy in the Victorian Football League (VFL).

Milne later served in the Australian Army during World War II.

Notes

External links 

Roy Milne's playing statistics from The VFA Project

1909 births
1977 deaths
Australian rules footballers from Melbourne
Fitzroy Football Club players
Northcote Football Club players
People from Carlton, Victoria
Military personnel from Melbourne
Australian Army personnel of World War II